The 2020–21 UTSA Roadrunners women's basketball team represents the University of Texas at San Antonio during the 2020–21 NCAA Division I women's basketball season. The team is led by fourth-year head coach Kristen Holt, and plays their home games at the Convocation Center in San Antonio, Texas as a member of Conference USA.

Schedule and results

|-
!colspan=12 style=|Non-conference regular season

|-
!colspan=12 style=|CUSA regular season

|-
!colspan=12 style=| CUSA Tournament

See also
 2020–21 UTSA Roadrunners men's basketball team

Notes

References

UTSA Roadrunners women's basketball seasons
UTSA Roadrunners
UTSA Roadrunners women's basketball
UTSA Roadrunners women's basketball